The men's K-2 500 metres event was a pairs kayaking event conducted as part of the Canoeing at the 2000 Summer Olympics program.

Medalists

Results

Heats
19 crews were entered into the event. The top finishers from each of the three heats advanced directly to the finals while the remaining teams were relegated to the semifinals.

 
Overall Results Heats

Semifinals
The top three finishers in each of the two semifinals advanced to the final.

Overall Results Heats

Final

Because of the winds, the waters were as choppy as those used for the whitewater course. Australia moved from third to first with 50 meters left, only to have the Hungarians surge ahead at the finish to win the race. The winning time was 16 seconds slower than that of the qualifying heats four days earlier due to the adverse weather conditions.

References
2000 Summer Olympics Canoe sprint results. 
Sport-reference.com 2000 men's K-2 500 m results
Wallechinsky, David and Jaime Loucky (2008). "Canoeing: Men's Kayak Pairs 500 Meters". In The Complete Book of the Olympics: 2008 Edition. London: Aurum Press Limited. p. 474.

Men's K-2 500
Men's events at the 2000 Summer Olympics